Bogue Chitto may refer to:
Bogue Chitto, Alabama, an unincorporated community in Dallas County, Alabama
Bogue Chitto, Lincoln County, Mississippi, an unincorporated community in Lincoln County, Mississippi
Bogue Chitto, Mississippi, a census-designated place (CDP) in Neshoba and Kemper counties, Mississippi
Bogue Chitto National Wildlife Refuge, in Louisiana and Mississippi
Bogue Chitto River, in Louisiana and Mississippi
Bogue Chitto State Park, in Washington Parish, Louisiana